Sélibaby Airport  is an airport serving Sélibaby, a town in the Guidimaka region of southern Mauritania.

References

External links
 

Airports in Mauritania
Guidimaka Region